WBSN-FM is a Contemporary Christian outlet in New Orleans, Louisiana. The station, which operates at 89.1 MHz with an ERP of 11 kW, is owned by Providence Educational Foundation, which signed the outlet on the air in 1979.

Programming
LifeSongs Radio airs a format consisting of Christian contemporary music. The Station broadcasts in HD radio but has no sub channels in use

Network
WBSN is the flagship station of "LifeSongs Radio".  LifeSongs is also heard on KPEF 90.7 in White Castle, Louisiana, WPEF 91.5 in Kentwood, Louisiana, as well as a translator on 97.7 in Houma, Louisiana.

Recent License History
Prior to Hurricane Katrina, WBSN's 8,500 watt transmitter was co-located with that of TV station WDSU and shared their transmitting tower.  After the WDSU transmitter building was flooded during Katrina, WBSN applied for, and was granted Special Temporary Authority (STA) from the FCC to transmit at 5,000 watts from a multi-purpose tower in Algiers.  More recently, the station applied for and was granted a permanent license to transmit from the Algiers tower location at 11,000 watts.

References

External links
 LifeSongs Radio online

WBSN
Radio stations established in 1979
1979 establishments in Louisiana
Christian radio stations in Louisiana